Peter Fraser (1921 – October 16, 2000) was a politician, Métis leader, and highway inspector from Northwest Territories, Canada. He served as a member of the Northwest Territories Legislature from 1979 until 1983.

Fraser was first elected in a 1976 by-election to the Northwest Territories Legislature in the electoral district of Mackenzie Great Bear. He ran for re-election in the 1979 general election and won a second term. Fraser ran again in the 1983 election, this time for the district of Sahtu (which had absorbed Mackenzie Great Bear), but lost to John T'Seleie.

References

Members of the Legislative Assembly of the Northwest Territories
1921 births
2000 deaths
Métis politicians
Date of birth missing
Canadian Métis people